Secret Story 11 is the eleventh season of the French reality television series Secret Story, a show which is based loosely on the international Big Brother format.

The applications were opened on May 11, 2017 and was closed on August 14, 2017.

The season starts on Friday, September 1, 2017 on TF1. It is hosted by Christophe Beaugrand for the daily recaps and the live shows, on NT1. Adrien Lemaitre, Leila Ben Khalifa and Julien Geloën participate with the main host to "Le Débrief" on NT1.

Noré Tir won the series on Day 98.

House of Secrets 
For the fourth time, after Secret Story 8, Secret Story 9 and Secret Story 10, the house is located on the rooftop of the studios of AB Productions which was used in the 1990s where many popular sitcoms were filmed, as Hélène et les Garçons and Premiers baisers. Perched on a building, the House of Secrets offers to the contestants a wide view of Paris.

The Campus of Secrets 
In this season, the House has become a Campus. The spirit of American universities is an integral part of the "Campus", and the magic spirit, as in Harry Potter is also present, as much in the decoration as in the mysteries of the game, and the game itself.

Housemates

Alain
 Alain Rochette is 39 years old. He is from Valencia, Spain. He was a contestant from the seventeenth season of Gran Hermano Spain. He entered on Day 1. He was evicted on Day 91.

Barbara
 Barbara Opsomer is a 27 years old singer and actress. She is from Paris, France. She entered on Day 1. She finished in third place on Day 98.

Benjamin
 Benjamin Macé is 28 years old. He is from Bordeaux, France. He entered on Day 42. He was evicted on Day 62.

Benoît
 Benoît Douady is 27 years old. He is from Tours, France. He entered on Day 1. He was evicted on Day 84.

Bryan
 Bryan Dubois is a 21 years old management student. He is from Los Angeles, United States. Bryan was called Mister Buzz, and created “Showtime baby” which made a lot of noise. He entered on Day 1. He was evicted on Day 49.

Cassandre
 Cassandre Lapierre is 26 years old. She is from Cannes, France. She entered on Day 42. She was evicted on Day 56.

Charlène
 Charlène Le Mer is 23 years old. She is from Tours, France. She entered on Day 1. She finished in fourth place on Day 98.

Charles
 Charles Theyssier is a 28 years old barman. He is from Annemasse, France. He entered on Day 1. He was evicted on Day 14.

Jordan
 Jordan Aumaitre is a 28 years old bus driver. He is from Vieux-Condé, France. He entered on Day 1. He was evicted on Day 70.

Julie
 Julie Robert is a 20 years old model. She is from Paris, France. She entered on Day 1. She was evicted on Day 21.

Kamila
 Kamila Tir is 23 years old. She is from Marseille, France. She entered on Day 1. She was evicted on Day 90.

Laura
 Laura Lempika is 27 years old. She is from Cannes, France. She entered on Day 1. She is Marie's best friend. Her secret is: "My best friend sacrificed herself to let me enter the House of Secrets". She finished as the runner up on Day 98.

Lydia
 Lydia Serbout is a 28 years old marketing student. She is from Toulouse, France. She entered on Day 1. Her secret is: "I am the spy of Internet users". She was evicted on Day 7.

Makao
 Alain-Gloirdy Bakwa is a 26 years old service agent. He is from Tours, France. He entered on Day 1. He was evicted on Day 28.

Marie
 Marie Thomae is a 28 years old waitress. She didn't enter the house on Day 1. She is Laura's best friend. She sacrificed herself to let Laura enter the house. She came into the House on Day 62 as a fake new housemate, and she quit on Day 70.

Nony
 Anthony Kruger is 33 years old. He is from Müllheim, Germany. He is the former member of the Tribal King. His secret is: "I was number 1 in the top 50 for several weeks". He didn't enter the house on Day 1.

Noré
 Noré Tir is a 29 years old plumber. He is from Marseille, France. He entered on Day 1. He finished as the winner on Day 98.

Shirley
 Shirley Lamy is 22 years old. She is from Franconville, France. She entered on Day 42. On Day 70 she is the last housemate to have arrived after the launch of the program to be still in play. She was evicted on Day 78.

Tanya
 Tanya Drouginska is a 68 years old model, actress and singer. She is from Paris, France. She entered on Day 1. Her secret is: "I pose for the biggest fashion magazines around the world". She was evicted on Day 35.

Ylies
 Ylies Djiroun is a security guard from Marseille, France. His secret is: "I am European martial arts champion". He didn't enter the house on Day 1.

Secrets

Nominations

Notes

Nominations : Results

References

External links
  Official website for Secret Story
  Social network page for Secret Story
 Big brother news site

11
2017 French television seasons